Gim Won-sul (김원술, 金元述, before 660-675?), also known as Kim Won-sul was a second son of the Silla General Gim Yu-sin, and served under Silla's 30th ruler, King Munmu, and played a major role in defending the kingdom against Tang China's invaders after the conquest of both Goguryeo and Baekje by the year 668.

Background 
Gim Won-sul was the second son of General Gim Yu-sin, and direct descendant of King Suro, the founder of Geumgwan Gaya. Gim Won-sul was a member of the Silla's Jinggol class, and rose to the rank of Low-level general by the time of Goguryeo's fall to the Silla-Tang Alliance.

Unification Wars 
In 660, the kingdom of Baekje fell to the armies of the Silla-Tang Alliance. Baekje was then followed by the kingdom of Goguryeo, which fell in 668 to the Silla-Tang Alliance as well. General Gim Yu-sin's reputation as the greatest general of Silla rose during these Unification Wars. 

General Won-sul was near Baeksu Castle in August of the year 672, fighting Tang Dynasty troops. Silla troops seemed to be winning the battle at the beginning. However, they chased the retreating Chinese troops and fell into a trap that killed seven generals and countless soldiers. As Won-sul realized that defeat was unavoidable, he prepared to die by jumping into the enemy lines. His staff, however, blocked him and said, “It is not difficult for a brave man to die. What’s more difficult is to choose when to die. Dying worthless is worse than revenging later." Won-sul answered, “A man never lives a humiliating life" and then whipped his horse to make a dash. His staff, however, held the horse by the bridle and did not let go. Wonsul could not die at the battle and returned to Gyeongju.

Abandonment and Redemption 
Outraged, Yu-sin asked King Munmu to execute his shameful son. He was earnest about the execution because Silla lost as many as seven generals in the battle. King Munmu, however, refused to punish Won-Sul. Being ashamed of himself and afraid of facing his father, Won-Sul hid in a secluded area. 

In June 673, people witnessed several dozen crying soldiers in armor with weapons in their hands walking out of Yu-sin's home. Then, they vanished without a trace. Hearing about the strange incident, Yu-sin said, "They were the heavenly guardian soldiers who protected me. Now, my luck ran out. I shall die very soon." On July 1, 673, General Gim Yu-sin died at 79.

Won-Sul returned home to attend his father's funeral. However, his mother, Lady Jiso, rejected him, although he was accused wrongfully of being a coward. She said, "How can I be the mother of a son who was not a son to his father." Kim Won-Sul cried and returned to his hiding place. 

In September 675, Won-Sul returned to fight the invading Tang at the Battle of Maeso. He fought as if anxious to die on the battlefield. As a result, he achieved a great victory over the Tang troops. When the war was over, Kim Chunchu awaited his presence to award him in Gyeongju highly. He, however, never returned to Gyeongju and went deep into the mountains regretting his impiety to his parents.

Death 
Gim Won-sul spent the rest of his days, starving in the mountains, and died in an unknown year at an early age.

Popular culture
 Portrayed by Baek Seung-woo in the 2012-2013 KBS1 TV series Dream of the Emperor.

See also 
 Three Kingdoms of Korea
 Silla-Tang War
 Gim Yu-sin
 Munmu of Silla

Military history of Korea
Silla Buddhists
Korean generals
Korean warriors
Gimhae Kim clan
Year of death unknown
Year of birth unknown